Mazères is a commune in the Gironde department in Nouvelle-Aquitaine in southwestern France.

Population

See also
Communes of the Gironde department
 Château de Roquetaillade

References

Communes of Gironde